Nchelenge is a constituency of the National Assembly of Zambia. It covers Nchelenge and several of the surrounding towns in Nchelenge District of Luapula Province.

List of MPs

References

Constituencies of the National Assembly of Zambia
1973 establishments in Zambia
Constituencies established in 1973